Daniella Ferrante Perez Gazolla (11 August 1970 – 28 December 1992) was a Brazilian actress and dancer.

She worked in the novelas Barriga de Aluguel (1990), O Dono do Mundo (1991), and De Corpo e Alma (1992). She was murdered by De Corpo e Alma co-star Guilherme de Pádua and his then wife Paula Thomaz, at the age of 22.

She was the only daughter of Glória Perez.

Life and career

Perez was born in Rio de Janeiro to telenovela writer Glória Perez and her husband, an engineer, Luiz Carlos Saupiquet Perez (1940–1994). She had two younger brothers: Rodrigo (born 1972) and Rafael (1977–2002). Her parents were divorced in 1984.

Her interest in the arts began at an early age. At five, she began dancing and as a teenager she was invited to dance professionally for Vacilou, Dançou, a dance company in Rio de Janeiro. Her first role in television was a tango dancer in the Rede Manchete novela Kananga do Japão, and her dance group was invited by Rede Globo to act in the novela Barriga de Aluguel, written by her mother. Perez auditioned for the novela and got the part of Clô, a dancer in the fictional club Copacabana Café. Due to her charisma and talent, Clô, initially a minor character, eventually gained more screentime.

Her acting got the attention of director Dennis Carvalho, who invited her to star in O Dono do Mundo, where she portrayed Yara, sister of the main character played by Glória Pires. In 1992, Perez was cast in her mother's novela, De Corpo e Alma, as Yasmin, a young woman who was the object of affection of Eri Johnson's character. Yasmin was the sister of the main character of the novela, who was played by Cristiana Oliveira. De Corpo e Alma was her last work. Following her death, the departure of Perez's character was explained as her going to study abroad. Her murderer's character was removed from the story.

On December 25, 1992, she played Mary, mother of Jesus, in a Christmas special, Roberto Carlos Especial, alongside Cássia Kis Magro and Herson Capri.

Perez was married to actor Raul Gazolla, whom she met on the set of  Kananga do Japão, from 1990 until her death.

Death and aftermath

Perez was 22 years old when she was murdered by former actor Guilherme de Pádua (her co-star in De Corpo e Alma) and his then-wife, Paula Nogueira Thomaz (now called Paula Nogueira Peixoto). On the night of December 28, 1992, Perez was ambushed and killed by 18 stab wounds that pierced through her neck, lungs, and heart. On the following day, news outlets reported her murder was committed by co-star and actor Guilherme de Pádua, who attended Daniella's funeral before authorities suspected him of any involvement in her death. The  murder of Daniella outshined the breaking news of Brazilian president Fernando Collor de Mello's impeachment, on December 29.

The reason behind the crime was the envy and frustration Pádua had for not getting the screentime he felt he deserved. After constantly harassing Perez, and trying to get her to guarantee him more scenes in the soap opera, since she was the daughter of the author, who he thought was purposely cutting him off from the novela, Pádua began planning her murder. Coincidentally, in the week prior to her murder, his character had been cut off from several scenes. His wife, Paula Thomáz, was jealous of his interactions with Perez and their love scenes in the soap opera and planned the murder with him.

Pádua and Thomáz were convicted of second degree manslaughter with foul motive and impossibility of defense of the victim and only served 6 of their 19-year closed regime penalty.

The popular indignation that followed this episode resulted in the change of penal legislation thanks to the efforts of Daniella's mother, Gloria Perez, who led a campaign of signatures and managed to pass the first popular bill initiative to become effective law (Law 8.930 / 1994) in the history of Brazil.

In March 2002, Judge Paulo Gustavo Horta ruled that Glória Perez and Raul Gazolla should receive a fine of 500 minimum salaries, or about R$440,000 each, from Guilherme de Pádua and Paula Thomaz. The lawsuit was judged in the second instance by the 7th Civil Chamber of the TJ / RJ. According to the decision, the defendants were also ordered to pay burial and funeral expenses, in the order of five minimum salaries, in addition to the procedural costs and attorney's fees of 10% on the conviction.

After Perez and Gazolla were brought back to court with this action demanding payment, on April 29, 2016 they finally succeeded in winning a lawsuit claiming compensation for moral and material damages against Guilherme de Pádua and Paula Thomaz.

Gazolla stated after winning the lawsuit: "What I can say is that there is no money in the world that pays for murder. Money does not pay murder. What I would really like is not to receive any money, as long as the killers were behind bars and not loose enjoying life as the two are doing around. To me, killers should be in jail."

On July 21, 2022, HBO Max launched the documentary series Brutal Pact - The Assassination of Daniella Perez (:pt:Pacto Brutal - O Assassinato de Daniella Perez), with statements by mother Gloria Perez, the widower Raul Gazolla, friends and colleagues of the actress.

Filmography

Television

Awards and recognitions

References

External links
 
 Kiss of Death, on People magazine
 A slaying stuns Brazil, on The New York Times
 Second conviction, on The New York Times

1970 births
1992 deaths
Brazilian people of Spanish descent
Actresses from Rio de Janeiro (city)
20th-century Brazilian actresses
Brazilian television actresses
Brazilian ballerinas
People murdered in Brazil
Deaths by stabbing in Brazil